The 2018 German Darts Championship was the tenth of thirteen PDC European Tour events on the 2018 PDC Pro Tour. The tournament took place at Halle 39, Hildesheim, Germany from 31 August–2 September 2018. It featured a field of 48 players and £135,000 in prize money, with £25,000 going to the winner.

Peter Wright was the defending champion after defeating Michael van Gerwen 6–3 in the 2017 final, but he withdrew the day before the event.

Van Gerwen won the event for the second time and his 27th European Tour title in total, beating James Wilson 8–6 in the final, and only dropping seven legs in the whole tournament.

During the event, Dave Chisnall broke the record for the highest ever 3-dart average on the European Tour, with an average of 118.66 in his 6–0 defeat of Mark Webster in the second round.

Prize money
This is how the prize money is divided:

Prize money will count towards the PDC Order of Merit, the ProTour Order of Merit and the European Tour Order of Merit, with one exception: should a seeded player lose in the second round (last 32), their prize money will not count towards any Orders of Merit, although they still receive the full prize money payment.

Qualification and format 
The top 16 entrants from the PDC ProTour Order of Merit on 8 June will automatically qualify for the event and will be seeded in the second round.

The remaining 32 places will go to players from five qualifying events – 18 from the UK Qualifier (held in Wigan on 15 June), eight from the West/South European Qualifier (held on 30 August), four from the Host Nation Qualifier (held on 30 August), one from the Nordic & Baltic Qualifier (held on 26 May) and one from the East European Qualifier (held on 25 August).

Peter Wright, who would have been the number 2 seed, withdrew from the tournament prior to the draw. Steve Beaton, the highest-ranked qualifier, was promoted to 16th seed, which meant an extra place was made available in the Host Nation Qualifier.

The following players will take part in the tournament:

Top 16
  Michael van Gerwen (champion)
  Michael Smith (third round)
  Rob Cross (quarter-finals)
  Daryl Gurney (third round)
  Joe Cullen (semi-finals)
  Mensur Suljović (semi-finals)
  Jonny Clayton (second round)
  Ian White (second round)
  Dave Chisnall (quarter-finals)
  James Wade (second round)
  Darren Webster (third round)
  Gerwyn Price (second round)
  Mervyn King (second round)
  Simon Whitlock (second round)
  Stephen Bunting (second round)
  Steve Beaton (second round)

UK Qualifier
  Kyle Anderson (second round)
  Ricky Evans (second round)
  Adrian Lewis (quarter-finals)
  James Wilson (runner-up)
  Richard North (first round)
  Terry Jenkins (third round)
  Andy Boulton (first round)
  Darren Johnson (second round)
  Justin Pipe (first round)
  Ross Smith (first round)
  David Pallett (first round)
  Josh Payne (second round)
  Lee Bryant (first round)
  Mark Webster (second round)
  Robert Thornton (third round)
  Ted Evetts (first round)
  Andrew Gilding (second round)

West/South European Qualifier
  Ron Meulenkamp (quarter-finals)
  Jermaine Wattimena (first round)
  Danny Noppert (first round)
  Cristo Reyes (second round)
  Jan Dekker (third round)
  Michael Rasztovits (third round)
  Vincent van der Voort (first round)
  Toni Alcinas (first round)

Host Nation Qualifier
  Robert Marijanović (first round)
  Martin Schindler (third round)
  Max Hopp (first round)
  Christopher Hänsch (first round)
  Nico Blum (first round)

Nordic & Baltic Qualifier
  Darius Labanauskas (first round)

East European Qualifier
  Krzysztof Ratajski (second round)

Draw

References

2018
2018 PDC European Tour
2018 in German sport
Sport in Hildesheim
August 2018 sports events in Germany